The Sherwood Metros (formerly the Sherwood Falcons) are a Canadian Junior C ice hockey team located in Sherwood, Charlottetown, Prince Edward Island. They play in the Prince Edward Island Junior C Hockey League.

History

The Sherwood Falcons were founded in 2005, and have played in Charlottetown for their entire existence. They became defunct between 2009 and 2013, before being resurrected for the 2013–14 season. They were renamed the Metros in 2015.

Incident vs. Aces
In March 2013, in the final game of the season, a brawl erupted when, as handshakes were taking place, three players from the Sherwood Falcons crossed centre ice and charged the Aces' players. The Aces had just won the game to advance to the league final. Eight players and two coaches were suspended beginning the next season.

Season by season

Maritime-Hockey North Junior C Championship
Eastern Canada Jr C Championships

See also

 Violence in hockey
 List of ice hockey teams in Prince Edward Island

References

External links
PEI Junior C Website

2005 establishments in Prince Edward Island
Ice hockey teams in Prince Edward Island